Phyllecthris is a genus of leaf beetles in the family Chrysomelidae. There are at least three described species in Phyllecthris. They are found in North America.

Species
These three species belong to the genus Phyllecthris:
 Phyllecthris dorsalis (Olivier, 1808)
 Phyllecthris gentilis J. L. LeConte, 1865
 Phyllecthris texanus J. L. LeConte, 1884

References

Further reading

 
 

Galerucinae
Chrysomelidae genera
Articles created by Qbugbot
Taxa named by Pierre François Marie Auguste Dejean